Lost Horse Mine is a historic gold and silver mine in the Lost Horse Valley of Joshua Tree National Park. Between 1894 and 1931, it produced 10,000 ounces of gold and 16,000 ounces of silver. It was first developed by Johnny Lang, then by J.D. Ryan. Scarce resources for steam powered pumps and mining equipment, led to denuding the local mountains of trees, which is still clearly visible in 2014.

References

Joshua Tree National Park
Gold mines in California
Mining in Riverside County, California
Buildings and structures in Riverside County, California